The 2007 Six Days of Zürich were six-day track cycling races held from 28 December 2006 to 2 January 2007 in the Hallenstadion in Zürich.

Participants

Main participants

Derny endurance participants

Results

Six Days main event

Six Days Derny endurance

External links
Official website

2006 in track cycling
2006 in Swiss sport
2007 in track cycling
2007 in Swiss sport
Cycle races in Switzerland